The International Council of Christian Churches (Abbreviation: ICCC) was founded on 12 August 1948 at the English Reformed Church, Amsterdam, as a fundamentalist Christian group of constituent national churches with opposition to the more liberal-leaning World Council of Churches.

One of the main leaders of the movement was Carl McIntire, a Presbyterian minister, who also founded a number of Bible colleges and the American Council of Christian Churches.

World Congresses

Leadership

See also
Thomas Todhunter Shields

References 

International Christian organizations
Christian organizations established in 1948
Christian fundamentalism